Hada (written: 波田, 羽田 or 秦) is a surname. Notable people with the surname include:

 Akira Hada (波田 晃) or Yoku Hata (波田 陽区) (born 1975), Japanese stand up comedian
, retired Japanese footballer
, Japanese professional footballer
, Japanese actress
 Shail Hada (born 1975), Indian singer

Japanese-language surnames